The Central Committee of German Catholics (ZdK) is a lay body comprising representatives of various Catholic organisations in Germany. They organise the Catholic Days in Germany. The organisation is headquartered in Berlin.

Its predecessor, the Catholic Society of Germany, was founded in 1848 by Charles, 6th Prince of Löwenstein-Wertheim-Rosenberg, who served as its first President. In 1952, it was renamed the Central Committee of German Catholics. In 2000 a conservative organization, the Forum of German Catholics, was founded in opposition to the committee.

In May 2015 the Central Committee of German Catholics voted in favour of blessing of same-sex unions in Christian churches.

References 

Catholic Church in Germany
1848 establishments in Germany
Christian political organizations
Religious organizations established in 1848